George Cleethorpe (17 December 1883 – 25 August 1961) was an Irish or Scottish-born American silent film actor.

George Cleethorpe was born on 17 December 1883 in Scotland, or possibly Ireland.

Cleethorpe acted with Charlie Chaplin at Essanay Studios in Los Angeles from 1915, and continued with him at Mutual. In 1918, he worked for Broncho Billy Anderson’s Golden West, and in 1921 was an assistant director at Jess Robbins.

Cleethorpe's wife Marie died in 1932.  He died on 25 August 1961.

Partial filmography
Police (1916)

References

1883 births
American male silent film actors
20th-century American male actors
Place of birth unknown
Year of death unknown
British emigrants to the United States